John Lucas is an American comic book inker and penciller, whose style has been compared with that of Russ Heath and Jack Kirby.

A prolific freelance contributor to both DC and Marvel Comics, Lucas has also produced a great deal of small press work, as well as "Valkyries" (with Steve Moore) for 2000 AD.

Bibliography
Comics work includes:

After Houdini (Insight Comics)
Atomic Chili: The Illustrated Joe R. Lansdale (Mojo Press)
Before Houdini (Insight Comics)
Civil War: Front Line inker (Marvel Comics)
Codename: Knockout (Vertigo/DC Comics)
Desperadoes: "Epidemic" (one-shot, Homage Comics)
Dick Tracy (syndicated strip, GoComics)
Drive-In 3: The Bus Tour (aka Drive-In 3) (Subterranean Press)
The Exterminators inker (Vertigo/DC Comics)
Fantastic Four Vol. 6 #7 inker, with Aaron Kuder (Marvel Comics)
Forever Maelstrom (DC Comics)
Generation M inker (Marvel Comics)
Living in Infamy (Ludovico Technique)
Negative Burn #47 (Caliber Press)
Occurrences: The Illustrated Ambrose Bierce (Mojo Press)
Starman (DC Comics)
Star Trek (Wildstorm/DC Comics)
Superman: The Man of Steel (DC Comics)
Weird Business artist on "Green Brother" and inker (credited as Little Johny Lovecloud) on "Dinosaur Love" (Mojo Press)
The Wild West Show (Mojo Press)
Valkyries (with Steve Moore, in 2000 AD #1377–1382, 2004)
X-Men Unlimited Vol. 2 (Marvel Comics)

References 

Other sources
John Lucas at 2000 AD online

External links

A Baker's Dozen With . . . John Lucas
Comic Art Gallery
Podcast interview with cIndyCenter.com 2008
http://johnlucasart.wordpress.com/

Year of birth missing (living people)
Living people
Comics inkers
American Splendor artists